Willem van 't Spijker (21 September 1926 – 23 July 2021) was a Dutch minister and theologian. He was specialized in church history and church law.

Life 
Willem van 't Spijker was born and grew up in Zwolle in a simple family characterized by sincere piety. He married the daughter of Professor Hovius, and studied theology in Apeldoorn. Van 't Spijker graduated from the Vrije Universiteit Amsterdam in 1970 with a dissertation titled "The offices of Martin Bucer". After working as a minister at Drogeham and Utrecht, he became a professor at the Theological University of Apeldoorn of the Christian Reformed Churches. In 1997 he took leave as a professor and as succeeded by Herman Selderhuis. In his academic education and his publications, he specialized in the Reformation period.

He was appointed Knight of the Order of the Dutch Lion; he received this distinction in particular because of his many publications in the field of ecclesiastical and scientific studies. He also received an honorary doctorate in theology from the University of Christian Higher Education in Potchefstroom.

Further reading 
 Calvin: A Brief Guide to His Life and Thought, Westminster John Knox Press, 2009
 Calvin: Biografie und Theologie (KIRCHE IN IHRER GESCHICHTE), Vandehoeck & Rupprecht, 2001, 
 The Ecclesiastical Offices in the Thought of Martin Bucer (Studies in Medieval and Reformation Traditions) (Mnemosyne, Bibliotheca Classica Batava), 1996,

References

1926 births
2021 deaths
Dutch Calvinist and Reformed theologians
People from Zwolle
Vrije Universiteit Amsterdam alumni